KXBX (1270 AM) is a radio station broadcasting a classic hits format. Licensed to Lakeport, California, United States, the station is currently owned by Bicoastal Media Licenses, LLC and features programming from CNN Radio and Westwood One, formerly Dial Global.

History
The station went on the air in 1966 as KBLC.  On 1984-07-16 the call letters were changed to KWTR. On 1990-09-21, the station again changed its call sign to the current KXBX.

Previous logo

References

External links
FCC History Cards for KXBX

XBX
Lakeport, California
Classic hits radio stations in the United States
Radio stations established in 1984
1984 establishments in California